Nathan J. Brown (born July 9, 1958) is an American scholar of Middle Eastern law and politics at George Washington University. Brown is Professor of Political Science and International Affairs at the Elliott School of International Affairs and the former director of its Institute for Middle East Studies.

Education
He received his BA from the University of Chicago and his PhD from Princeton University.

Career and work
His work is focused on Islamic politics, particularly in Egypt and the Palestinian territories, having his work published in The Washington Post and Islamist movements in the Arab world. His highest cited paper is "The rule of law in the Arab world: courts in Egypt and the Gulf" at 288 times, according to Google Scholar.

Brown served two years as a senior associate at the Carnegie Endowment for International Peace was a scholar at the Middle East Institute. He is currently on the Board of Advisors of the Project on Middle East Democracy.  Brown was selected as a 2013 Guggenheim Fellow for Near East Studies.

Selected publications
 Peasant Politics in Modern Egypt: The Struggle Against the State. Yale University Press, 1990.
 The Rule of Law in the Arab World: Courts in Egypt and the Gulf. Cambridge University Press, 1997.
 Constitutions in a Non-Constitutional World: Arab Basic Laws and the Prospects for Accountable Government. State University of New York Press, 2001.
 Palestinian Politics After the Oslo Accords: Resuming Arab Palestine. University of California Press, 2003.
 When Victory Is Not an Option: Islamist Movements in Arab Politics. Cornell University Press, 2012.
 Evolution after Revolution: Egypt, Israel and the United States. (2013). Israel Journal of Foreign Affairs, VII (1), 9-12.
 Arguing Islam After the Revival of Arab Politics. Oxford University Press, 2017.

See also 
 Peter Mandaville

References

External links
 Democracy, History, and the Contest Over the Palestinian Curriculum

Elliott School of International Affairs faculty
American political scientists
Living people
1958 births
George Washington University faculty